The 1963 Leeds South by-election was held on Thursday 20 June 1963. It was held due to the death of the incumbent MP and Leader of the Labour Party, Hugh Gaitskell. The by-election was won by the Labour candidate, Merlyn Rees who would later become a Cabinet minister.

References

South, 1963
June 1963 events in the United Kingdom
1963 in England
1960s in Leeds
1963 elections in the United Kingdom